The Nattai River, a perennial river that is part of the Hawkesbury-Nepean catchment, is located in the Southern Highlands region of New South Wales, Australia.

Course and features
The Nattai River rises on the Mittagong Range within the Great Dividing Range, south of Mittagong, and flows generally north northwest and then north northeast, joined by nine tributaries including the Little River, before reaching its confluence with the Wollondilly River within Lake Burragorang southwest of the locality of Nattai. The river descends  over its  course.

The river flows through the Nattai National Park and is a source of water for the Sydney region.

See also 

 List of rivers of Australia
 List of rivers of New South Wales (L–Z)
 Rivers of New South Wales

References

External links
 

Rivers of New South Wales
Southern Highlands (New South Wales)
Wollondilly Shire